Tucuyo is a type of coarse cotton cloth made in Latin America.

References

Woven fabrics